In Strange Woods is an American musical fiction podcast produced by Atypical Artists and created by Jeff Luppino-Esposito, Brett Ryback, and Matt Sav. The series is told in the style of a true crime documentary with an original folk-pop score.

It was nominated for Best Fiction Podcast at the 2022 iHeart Radio Podcast Awards.

Premise
After the tragic death of her brother in the Whitetail National Forest, 18-year-old Peregrine Wells seeks survivalist skills from the enigmatic old recluse who found her brother's body.

Cast and characters

Starring
 Brett Ryback as BRETT
 Lily Mae Harrington as PEREGRINE
 Donna Lynne Champlin as KATHY
 Patrick Page as HOWL
 Larry Bates as DONALD
 Michaela Watkins as IRENE
 Kristian Bruun as DECLAN
 Jonah Platt as SHERIFF PORTER
 Ryan Alexander Holmes as JOHN FRANCIS
 Lana McKissack as LEXY
 Philip Labes as WOODSLEY
 Briggon Snow as ERIC
 Raymond J. Lee as BOBBY
 Lauren Shippen as GERDA
 Beth Leavel as SANDRA

Additional Voices
 Julia Addis as VICKY, PARTY MOM
 Christian Barillas as DEREK RODRIGUEZ, PARTY MAN
 Jamison Haase as BAIT, FORDHAM
 Jeff Luppino-Esposito as PARTY DAD
 Vanessa Mizzone as PARTY WOMAN
 Brent Pope as TACKLE
 Danielle Robay as CHELSEA HAMILTON
 Matt Sav as "HAPPY TIMES" VOCALIST

Episodes

Production

Music & Sound
The series features original music composed by Brett Ryback and Matt Sav, with lyrics by Ryback and Jeff Luppino-Esposito. Matt Sav and Evan Cunningham produced the music, and it was mixed and mastered by Cunningham.

Nicholas Quah of Vulture said of the show's sound that it "carries Spring Awakening vibes in its musical performances." Maureen Lee Lenker, writing for EW, commented that the score "draws more on the sound of The Decemberists or Sufjan Stevens than theatrical composers."

Sound design for the series was by Brandon Grugle and Stephen Jensen, and it was edited by Lauren Shippen and Jeff Luppino-Esposito.

Recording
The original pilot for the series was recorded in 2018, featuring many of the show's eventual stars, including Donna Lynne Champlin, Patrick Page, and Lily Mae Harrington.

After teaming up with Atypical Artists, In Strange Woods was recorded remotely during the 2020 lockdown for the COVID-19 pandemic.

Release

Podcast
The series premiered on December 14, 2020, on all major podcast platforms.

Cast Album
A cast album of original songs from the series was released independently through Atypical Artists on March 11, 2021.

Reception

Critical response
In Strange Woods received positive critical attention from The New York Times, The Guardian, The Wall Street Journal, and the BBC. The series currently has a 4.9 rating out of 5 on Spotify and a 4.4 out of 5 on Apple Podcasts.

Speaking to the show's format, Miranda Sawyer of The Guardian described it as "A musical drama that actually works," going on to say, "I am not a fan of musicals, but somehow this ambitious drama transcends." Rob Herting, CEO of Qcode Media writing for The Wall Street Journal, commented on the podcast's "part docu-fiction, part straight fiction and part musical" format, saying, "I love the ambition of it." And Ella Watts of the BBC 4 Podcast Radio Hour said, "on paper it shouldn't work, but it does here."

Other critics have focused on the work of the cast, including Phoebe Lett of The New York Times who said "the vocal performances are beautiful," and Chloe Rabinowitz of Broadway World who said that guest star Beth Leavel "makes a fierce dramatic turn with her tour-de-force performance."

On October 13, 2021, it was announced that In Strange Woods was nominated for Best Fiction Podcast at the 2022 iHeart Radio Podcast Awards.

References

2020 podcast debuts
2021 podcast endings
American musicals
Musical theatre podcasts